The 2003 Rice Owls baseball team represented Rice University in the 2003 NCAA Division I baseball season. The Owls played their home games at Reckling Park. The team was coached by Wayne Graham in his 12th season at Rice.

The Owls won 30 consecutive games to open the season 33-1 and won the Western Athletic Conference championship. Rice went on to win the College World Series, defeating the Stanford Cardinal in the championship series. It was the first national title that Rice had ever won in a team sport in the school's 91-year history.

Roster

Schedule 

! style="background:#5e6062;color:white;"| Regular Season
|- valign="top" 

|- align="center" bgcolor="#ddffdd"
| February 11 ||  || Reckling Park || 6-4 || Baker (W; 1-0) || 2,432 || 1-0 || –
|- align="center" bgcolor="#ddffdd"
| February 14 ||  || Minute Maid Park || 10-5 || Niemann (W; 1-0) || 8,405 || 2-0 || –
|- align="center" bgcolor="#ddffdd"
| February 15 ||  || Minute Maid Park || 4-3 ||  Humber (W; 1-0) || 14,484 || 3-0 || –
|- align="center" bgcolor="#ffdddd"
| February 16 ||  || Minute Maid Park || 5-6 || Ueckert (L; 1-0) || 10,416 || 3-1 || –
|- align="center" bgcolor="#ddffdd"
| February 18 || at  || Cougar Field || 3-0 || Townsend (W; 1-0) || 1,116 || 4-1 || –
|- align="center" bgcolor="#ddffdd"
| February 19 || at  || Bobcat Baseball Stadium || 6-0 || Matheny (W; 1-0) || 1,608 || 5-1 || –
|- align="center" bgcolor="#ddffdd"
| February 22 ||  || Reckling Park || 11-6 || Humber (W; 2-0) || 2,323 || 6-1 || –
|- align="center" bgcolor="#ddffdd"
| February 22 ||  || Reckling Park || 6-0 || Niemann (W; 2-0) || 2,562 || 7-1 || –
|- align="center" bgcolor="#ddffdd"
| February 23 ||  || Reckling Park || 1-0 (10) || Aardsma (W; 1-0) || 2,657 || 8-1 || –
|- align="center" bgcolor="#ddffdd"
| February 28 || Southwest Texas State || Reckling Park || 8-3 || Niemann (W; 3-0) || 2,054 || 9-1 || –
|-

|- align="center" bgcolor="#ddffdd"
| March 1 || Southwest Texas State || Reckling Park || 7-5 || Baker (W; 2-0) || 2,317 || 10-1 || –
|- align="center" bgcolor="#ddffdd"
| March 2 || Southwest Texas State || Reckling Park || 10-4 || Humber (W; 3-0) || 2,275 || 11-1 || –
|- align="center" bgcolor="#ddffdd"
| March 4 || Houston || Reckling Park || 4-3 || Aardsma (W; 2-0) || 2,618 || 12-1 || –
|- align="center" bgcolor="ddffdd"
| March 7 || at  || J.C. Love Field || 4-3 || Niemann (W; 4-0) || 529 || 13–1 || 1–0
|- align="center" bgcolor="ddffdd"
| March 8 || at Louisiana Tech || J.C. Love Field || 5-3 || Humber (W; 4-0) || 1,011 || 14–1 || 2–0
|- align="center" bgcolor="ddffdd"
| March 9 || at Louisiana Tech || J.C. Love Field || 12-0 || Baker (W; 3-0) || 827 || 15–1 || 3–0
|- align="center" bgcolor="ddffdd"
| March 11 || Texas || Reckling Park || 2-1 (10) || Aardsma (W; 3-0) || 4,525 || 16–1 || –
|- align="center" bgcolor="ddffdd"
| March 14 || at  || Les Murakami Stadium || 9-4 || Niemann (W; 5-0) || 2,919 || 17–1 || 4–0
|- align="center" bgcolor="ddffdd"
| March 15 || at Hawaii || Les Murakami Stadium || 9-2 || Humber (W; 5-0) || 3,426 || 18–1 || 5–0
|- align="center" bgcolor="ddffdd"
| March 16 || at Hawaii || Les Murakami Stadium || 11-1 || Baker (W; 4-0) || 2,271 || 19–1 || 6–0
|- align="center" bgcolor="ddffdd"
| March 18 ||  || Reckling Park || 4-1 || Townsend (W; 2-0) || 3,359 || 20–1 || –
|- align="center" bgcolor="ddffdd"
| March 19 || at Houston || Cougar Field || 7-6 (11) || Aardsma (W; 4-0) || 2,271 || 21-1 || –
|- align="center" bgcolor="ddffdd"
| March 21 ||  || Reckling Park || 20-1 || Humber (W; 6-0) || 2,851 || 22–1 || –
|- align="center" bgcolor="ddffdd"
| March 22 || Liberty || Reckling Park || 10-4 || Baker (W; 5-0) || 2,412 || 23–1 || –
|- align="center" bgcolor="ddffdd"
| March 23 || Liberty || Reckling Park || 5-4 || Niemann (W; 6-0) || 2,348 || 24–1 || –
|- align="center" bgcolor="ddffdd"
| March 25 ||  || Reckling Park || 4-3 || Townsend (W; 3-0) || 3,683 || 25–1 || –
|- align="center" bgcolor="ddffdd"
| March 28 ||  || Reckling Park || 12-2 || Humber (W; 7-0) || 2,180 || 26–1 || 7–0
|- align="center" bgcolor="ddffdd"
| March 29 || San Jose State || Reckling Park || 21-1 || Niemann (W; 7-0) || 2,837 || 27–1 || 8–0
|- align="center" bgcolor="ddffdd"
| March 30 || San Jose State || Reckling Park || 8-1 || Baker (W; 6-0) || 3,118 || 28–1 || 9–0
|-

|- align="center" bgcolor="ddffdd"
| April 1 || Houston || Reckling Park || 11-0 || Townsend (W; 4-0) || 3,320 || 29-1 || –
|- align="center" bgcolor="ddffdd"
| April 4 || Hawaii || Reckling Park || 11-0 || Humber (W; 8-0) || 3,215 || 30–1 || 10–0
|- align="center" bgcolor="ddffdd"
| April 5 || Hawaii || Reckling Park || 2-0 || Niemann (W; 8-0) || 2,835 || 31–1 || 11–0
|- align="center" bgcolor="ddffdd"
| April 6 || Hawaii || Reckling Park || 8-1 || Baker (W; 7-0) || 2,614 || 32–1 || 12–0
|- align="center" bgcolor="ddffdd"
| April 8 || Texas A&M || Reckling Park || 8-0 || Townsend (W; 5-0) || 4,414 || 33–1 || –
|- align="center" bgcolor="ffdddd"
| April 9 ||  || Reckling Park || 5-7 || Aardsma (L; 4-1) || 2,417 || 33–2 || –
|- align="center" bgcolor="ffdddd"
| April 11 || at  || Pete Beiden Field || 3-7 || Humber (L; 8-1) || 2,727 || 33–3 || 12–1
|- align="center" bgcolor="ddffdd"
| April 12 || at Fresno State || Pete Beiden Field || 9-2 || Niemann (W; 9-0) || 2,724 || 34–3 || 13–1
|- align="center" bgcolor="ddffdd"
| April 13 || at Fresno State || Pete Beiden Field || 3-2 || Townsend (W; 6-0) || 2,564 || 35–3 || 14–1
|- align="center" bgcolor="ffdddd"
| April 15 || at  || Don Sanders Stadium || 1-8 || Aardsma (L; 4-2) || 481 || 35–4 || –
|- align="center" bgcolor="ffdddd"
| April 16 || at Houston || Cougar Field || 1-5 || Herce (L; 0-1) || 1,672 || 35-5 || –
|- align="center" bgcolor="ddffdd"
| April 18 ||  || Reckling Park || 10-5 || Matheny (W; 2-0) || 3,103 || 36–5 || 15–1
|- align="center" bgcolor="ddffdd"
| April 19 || Nevada || Reckling Park || 3-0 || Niemann (W; 10-0) || 3,314 || 37–5 || 16–1
|- align="center" bgcolor="ffdddd"
| April 20 || Nevada || Reckling Park || 5-6 || Herce (L; 0-2) || 2,313 || 37–6 || 16–2
|- align="center" bgcolor="ffdddd"
| April 22 || at Lamar || Vincent–Beck Stadium || 5-9 || Matheny (L; 2-1) || 1,406 || 37–7 || –
|- align="center" bgcolor="ddffdd"
| April 24 || Louisiana Tech || Reckling Park || 2-1 || Humber (W; 9-1) || 2,715 || 38–7 || 17–2
|- align="center" bgcolor="ddffdd"
| April 25 || Louisiana Tech || Reckling Park || 13-3 || Niemannn (W; 11-0) || 3,156 || 39–7 || 18–2
|- align="center" bgcolor="ddffdd"
| April 26 || Louisiana Tech || Reckling Park || 8-2 || Baker (W; 8-0) || 3,044 || 40–7 || 19–2
|-

|- align="center" bgcolor="ddffdd"
| May 7 || Sam Houston State || Reckling Park || 10-5 || Herce (W; 1-2) || 2,820 || 41–7 || –
|- align="center" bgcolor="ddffdd"
| May 9 || at Nevada || William Peccole Park || 13-11 || Humber (W; 10-1) || 1,206 || 42–7 || 20–2
|- align="center" bgcolor="ddffdd"
| May 10 || at Nevada || William Peccole Park || 7-4 || Niemann (W; 12-0) || 1,636 || 43–7 || 21–2
|- align="center" bgcolor="ffdddd"
| May 11 || at Nevada || William Peccole Park || 7-8 (10) || Aardsma (L; 4-3) || 1,875 || 43–8 || 21–3
|- align="center" bgcolor="ddffdd"
| May 14 || at  || Louis Guisto Field || 10-6 || Matheny (W; 3-1) || 356 || 44–8 || –
|- align="center" bgcolor="ddffdd"
| May 16 || at San Jose State || San Jose Municipal Stadium || 12-6 || Aardsma (W; 5-3) || 553 || 45–8 || 22–3
|- align="center" bgcolor="ddffdd"
| May 17 || at San Jose State || San Jose Municipal Stadium || 11-0 || Niemann (W; 13-0) || 612 || 46–8 || 23–3
|- align="center" bgcolor="ffdddd"
| May 17 || at San Jose State || Blethen Field || 6-8 || Townsend (L; 6-1) || 553 || 46–9 || 23–4
|- align="center" bgcolor="ffdddd"
| May 23 || Fresno State || Reckling Park || 1-2 || Humber (L; 10-2) || 3,015 || 46–10 || 23–5
|- align="center" bgcolor="ddffdd"
| May 24 || Fresno State || Reckling Park || 13-2 || Niemann (W; 14-0) || 2,938 || 47–10 || 24–5
|- align="center" bgcolor="ddffdd"
| May 25 || Fresno State || Reckling Park || 3-2 || Townsend (W; 7-1) || 3,105 || 48–10 || 25–5
|-

|- align="center" bgcolor="ddffdd"
| May 30 || vs.  || Reckling Park || 3–2 (10) || Townsend (W; 8-1) || 4,014 || 49–10 
|- align="center" bgcolor="ddffdd"
| May 31 || vs.  || Reckling Park || 10–1 || Niemann (W; 15-0) || 3,769 || 50–10 
|- align="center" bgcolor="ddffdd"
| June 1 || vs. Wichita State || Reckling Park || 5–2 || Townsend (W; 9-1) || 3,528 || 51–10 
|-

|- align="center" bgcolor="ffdddd"
| June 7 || vs. Houston || Reckling Park || 2–5 || Humber (L; 10-3) || 4,427 || 51–11 
|- align="center" bgcolor="ddffdd"
| June 8 || vs. Houston || Reckling Park || 10–2 || Niemann (W; 16-0) || 4,435 || 52–11 
|- align="center" bgcolor="ddffdd"
| June 9 || vs. Houston || Reckling Park || 5–2 || Townsend (W; 10-1) || 4,417 || 53–11 
|-

|- align="center" bgcolor="ddffdd"
| June 14 || vs.  || Rosenblatt Stadium || 4–2 || Niemann (W; 17-0) || 23,248 || 54–11
|- align="center" bgcolor="ddffdd"
| June 16 || vs. Texas || Rosenblatt Stadium || 12–2 || Townsend (W; 11-1) || 24,842 || 55–11
|- align="center" bgcolor="ddffdd"
| June 18 || vs. Texas || Rosenblatt Stadium || 5–4 || Aardsma (W; 6-1) || 23,170 || 56–11
|- align="center" bgcolor="ddffdd"
| June 21 || vs. Stanford || Rosenblatt Stadium || 4–3 (10) || Aardsma (W; 7-3) || 23,741 || 57–11
|- align="center" bgcolor="ffdddd"
| June 22 || vs. Stanford || Rosenblatt Stadium || 3–8 || Townsend (L; 11-2) || 17,907 || 57–12
|- align="center" bgcolor="ddffdd"
| June 23 || vs. Stanford || Rosenblatt Stadium || 14–2 || Humber (W; 11-3) || 18,494 || 58–12
|-

Awards and honors 
Dane Bubela
 All-WAC First Team

Enrique Cruz
 All-America Third Team
 College World Series All-Tournament Team
 All-WAC First Team

Austin Davis
 All-WAC First Team

Philip Humber
 All-America Second Team
 All-WAC First Team

Paul Janish
 All-WAC Second Team

Jeff Jorgensen
 All-WAC First Team

Chris Kolkhorst
 College World Series All-Tournament Team
 All-WAC First Team

Jeff Niemann
 All-America First Team
 College World Series All-Tournament Team
 WAC Pitcher of the Year

Justin Ruchti
 All-WAC Second Team

Vincent Sinisi
 All-WAC First Team

Wade Townsend
 All-America First Team
 All-WAC First Team

Owls in the 2003 MLB Draft 
The following members of the Rice Owls baseball program were drafted in the 2003 Major League Baseball Draft.

References

External links 
 

Rice Owls
Rice Owls baseball seasons
College World Series seasons
NCAA Division I Baseball Championship seasons
Western Athletic Conference baseball champion seasons